iTunes Connect is an Apple service that producers can use to distribute music, podcasts, movies, and TV programmes to customers on the iTunes Store and ebooks to customers on the Apple Books Store.

App Store Connect 

In June 2018, Apple launched a dedicated service, App Store Connect, for registered developers to publish apps on the App Store and Mac App Store. Previously, developers could use iTunes Connect to publish apps to the App Store.

Features 
Both iTunes Connect and App Store Connect let users add metadata to items, define which countries items are available in, view sales reports, and collaborate on the same projects by adding team members.

References 

Apple Inc. services
iTunes